Varun Khanna (born 12 October 1984) is an Indian cricketer who plays for Punjab. He made his List A debut for Punjab in the 2016–17 Vijay Hazare Trophy on 6 March 2017.

References

External links
 

1984 births
Living people
Indian cricketers
Punjab, India cricketers
Place of birth missing (living people)